Miles is an unincorporated community in Orange County, North Carolina, United States, located on U.S. Route 70, north of Buckhorn.

References 

Unincorporated communities in Orange County, North Carolina
Unincorporated communities in North Carolina